Beau-Vallon is a village in Mauritius located in Grand Port District. The village is administered by the Beau-Vallon Village Council under the aegis of the Grand Port District Council. According to the census made by Statistics Mauritius in 2011, the population was at 6,904.

See also 
 Districts of Mauritius
 List of places in Mauritius

References 

Populated places in Mauritius
Grand Port District